Centerville is an unincorporated community in Conecuh County, Alabama, United States, located near the communities of Battleground, Westpoint, and Longview.

References

Unincorporated communities in Conecuh County, Alabama
Unincorporated communities in Alabama